Nicholas Anderson (1865 – unknown) was an English professional footballer, who appeared for Wolverhampton Wanderers in the inaugural season of the Football League.

Nicholas Anderson made his League and club debut on 8 September 1888, as a forward for Wolverhampton Wanderers in a 1–1 draw against Aston Villa at Dudley Road, the then home of Wolverhampton Wanderers

He only played two of the "Wolves" 22 Football League matches in season 1888–89.

Nicholas Anderson had failed to make an impact at Dudley Road and left Wolverhampton Wanderers in May 1889.

References

 

1865 births
1921 deaths
Footballers from Wolverhampton
English footballers
Wolverhampton Wanderers F.C. players
English Football League players
Association football forwards